Ericca Kern  is a professional female bodybuilder and model from the United States.

Kern was born in  Kansas City, Missouri on June 18, 1965. Her family moved frequently but settled in Hermantown, Minnesota in 1975. At the age of 18 Kern discovered she had an eating disorder. In 1985 Kern was attending the University of Minnesota Duluth and found a small weight room. In 1987 Kern married and graduated from the University of Minnesota Duluth and gave birth to her daughter Jessica in 1988. Kern was divorced in 1992 and met future husband Brad Kern.  She started to train for her first show, the 1992 Gopher State championship.  There she placed first in the heavyweight class, and also won the overall championship. During the next four years Kern gained more success at local and national competitions. Finally in January 1995 Kern moved her family to Irvine, California and competed at the 1995 IFBB North American Bodybuilding Championships. Kern placed first in the heavyweight class and won the overall championship, earning her pro card. Kern currently lives in Danville, CA.

Contest history 
1992 Gopher State - 1st (HW & Overall)
1992 Minnesota State - 1st (HW)
1994 NPC Jr. USA - 1st (HW)
1994 NPC Nationals - 5th (HW)
1995 NPC USA Championship - 4th (HW)
1995 IFBB North American - 1st (HW & Overall)
1996 IFBB Ms. International - 15th
1997 IFBB Ms. International - 14th
1998 IFBB Ms. International - 13th

External links

1965 births
Living people
American female bodybuilders
Professional bodybuilders
People from Hermantown, Minnesota
21st-century American women